William George Hunt TD FCA (born 8 December 1946) served as Windsor Herald of Arms in Ordinary at the College of Arms in London from 1999 to 2017.

Life
Hunt worked for many years as a City chartered accountant before being appointed as Portcullis Pursuivant of Arms in Ordinary in 1992. He was promoted as Windsor Herald in 1999. In 2007 he succeeded Timothy Duke as Registrar of the College of Arms until 2014, and has been a Member of Council of The Heraldry Society since 1997. He retired as Windsor Herald on 31 May 2017.

Hunt was Clerk to HM Commission of Lieutenancy for the City of London (1990–2013) before being appointed to the Lieutenancy in 2012.

He was an elected Member of Common Council of the City of London Corporation (2004–2013) and is a liveryman and Past Master (2000–2001) of the Playing-Card Makers' Company.

He served in the Honourable Artillery Company retiring with the rank of Major in 2000. He was nominated as Genealogist of the Most Venerable Order of the Hospital of Saint John of Jerusalem in 2010, and appointed Commander of the Order of St John (CStJ) in 2011.

He married Michaela Wedel in 1998; the couple have two sons and live in London.

An heraldic design by William Hunt
South Wales Fire and Rescue Service

Honours
  - Commander of the Order of St John
  - Territorial Decoration
  - Service Medal of the Order of St John

Arms

See also
College of Arms
Institute of Chartered Accountants in England and Wales
Worshipful Company of Makers of Playing Cards
David Hunt, Baron Hunt of Wirral

References

External links
 Debrett's People of Today bio
 www.orderofstjohn.org
 www.cityoflondon.gov.uk

1946 births
Living people
People educated at Liverpool College
Alumni of the University of Southampton
University of Konstanz alumni
English accountants
English officers of arms
Honourable Artillery Company officers
British genealogists
Commanders of the Order of St John
Councilmen and Aldermen of the City of London